Siarhei Iosifavich Navumchyk (born January 15, 1961) is a Belarusian journalist and politician.

Navumchyk was born in Pastavy into a family of a Soviet state serviceman. In 1984 he graduated from the journalism faculty of the Belarusian State University in Minsk.

Navumchyk was member of the parliament of Belarus in 1990 - 1995 and one of the key members of the fraction of the Belarusian Popular Front.

On April 12, 1995, Navumchyk, along with other members of the parliamentary opposition, held a hunger strike and sitting protest against the controversial referendum initiated by president Alexander Lukashenko.

On March 26, 1996, Navumchyk fled from Belarus together with BPF party leader Zianon Pazniak. According to unverified information, the government of Alexander Lukashenko has ordered an arrest of Pazniak and Navumchyk, who both were prominent opposition figures.
Siarhei Navumchyk subsequently got political asylum in the United States and currently works for the Belarusian edition of Radio Liberty.

Since 1997, Siarhei Navumchyk is vice president of the Council of the Belarusian Democratic Republic in exile.

References

External links
 Publications by Siarhei Navumchyk on the website of Radio Liberty

1961 births
Living people
People from Pastavy
BPF Party politicians
Conservative Christian Party – BPF politicians
Members of the Supreme Council of Belarus
Members of the Rada of the Belarusian Democratic Republic
Belarusian journalists
Radio Free Europe/Radio Liberty people
Belarusian expatriates in the Czech Republic
American expatriates in the Czech Republic